Association of Mobile Telecom Operators of Bangladesh (AMTOB), is a national trade organization representing all mobile telecom operators in Bangladesh. Mahtab Uddin Ahmed, MD and CEO of Robi Axiata is currently serving the seat of President for AMTOB.

History 

AMTOB was founded in 2009 as a registered, non-governmental society for telecom operators and is located in Dhaka, Bangladesh. It represents the  Bangladesh mobile industry in negotiations with relevant government agencies, regulators, financial institutions, civil society, technical bodies, media and other national & international organizations. It is the main trade body of mobile telecom industry in Bangladesh and represent Banglalink, Grameenphone, Citycell, Robi and TeleTalk.

Members
The General Members of the body are:
 Banglalink
 Grameenphone
 Citycell
 Robi
 TeleTalk

The associate members of the body are:
 Ericsson
 Huawei
 Nokia

References

External links
 

1996 establishments in Bangladesh
Organisations based in Dhaka
Trade associations based in Bangladesh
Telecommunications organizations